Álvaro Sebastián Ramos Sepúlveda (born 14 April 1992) is a Chilean football player that currently plays for Deportes Iquique as a forward.

Honours

Club
Deportes Iquique
 Copa Chile: 2010
 Primera B: 2010

International
Chile
 China Cup: 2017

External links
 

1992 births
Living people
People from Iquique
Chilean footballers
Chile international footballers
Chile youth international footballers
Chile under-20 international footballers
Deportes Iquique footballers
Club Deportivo Universidad Católica footballers
Santiago Wanderers footballers
Club León footballers
Everton de Viña del Mar footballers
Coquimbo Unido footballers
Chilean Primera División players
Primera B de Chile players
Liga MX players
Expatriate footballers in Mexico
Chilean expatriate sportspeople in Mexico
Association football forwards